Rubtsovo is a rural locality (a village) in Andomskoye Rural Settlement, Vytegorsky District, Vologda Oblast, Russia. The population was 29 as of 2002.

Geography 
Rubtsovo is located 35 km northeast of Vytegra (the district's administrative centre) by road. Perevoz is the nearest rural locality.

References 

Rural localities in Vytegorsky District